Volker Rohde (4 May 1939 – 22 October 2000) was a German conductor and academic teacher.

Life 
Rohde was born in Greifswald. He studied with Willy Niepold and Horst Förster at the Hochschule für Musik "Hanns Eisler".

In 1962/63, he became solo répétiteur at the Landestheater Altenburg. He then moved to the Komische Oper Berlin. In 1970, he became first Kapellmeister in Zwickau. From 1972 to 1976, he was first Kapellmeister at the Semperoper Dresden. Subsequently, he became musical director in Halle. As such, he was chief conductor of the Halle Opera House Orchestra from 1976 to 1979. In 1978 he conducted Handel's opera Radamisto in a production by Martin Schneider. On the occasion of the Handel Festival, Halle. In 1981/82, he took over the musical direction of the  production of Heinrich Ignaz Franz Biber's Arminius at the Komische Oper Berlin. In 1981, he conducted with the Dresden Philharmonic Orchestra Günter Neubert's Lessing Fables for tenor, choir and orchestra (with Joachim Vogt). In 1983, he became deputy chief conductor of the Dresden State Opera. Together with the Kammerharmonie der Staatskapelle Dresden, he opened the Dresden Music Festival in 1984 with the world premiere of Weiss's Music for Eight Winds. In 1990, he became musical director at the Oper Leipzig. After Lothar Zagrosek's resignation as general music director in 1992, he took over the duties of the artistic director Udo Zimmermann at his request. His repertoire included among others Wagner, Rossini and Mozart. In 1992, he conducted the premiere of the John Dew production of Mozart's Così fan tutte in Leipzig. With Ligeti's Le Grand Macabre, he also took over the conducting at a contemporary opera. "The experienced but artistically pale" Rohde, according to Fritz Hennenberg, however, then had to give way to Jiří Kout.

In 1988, he was appointed professor at the Hochschule für Musik Carl Maria von Weber Dresden as professor with artistic teaching duties. He then taught at the University of Music and Theatre Leipzig, where teaching duties in conducting were combined with conducting the university symphony orchestra, which he chaired from 1992 to 1997, succeeding Christian Kluttig.

He also made numerous radio recordings.

Rohde was married and father of one child.

Awards 
 1969: Second place at the Dresden Carl Maria von Weber Competition for Conductors.
 1974: Fourth place at the International Conducting Competition in Budapest, announced by the ungarische Fernsehen

Further reading 
 Maria F. Rich (ed.): Who’s who in opera: an international biographical directory of singers, conductors, directors, designers, and administrators, also including profiles of 101 opera companies. Arno Press, New York 1976, .
 Horst Seeger: Das grosse Lexikon der Oper. Über 12000 Stichwörter und Erklärungen. Pawlak, Herrsching 1985, .

References

External links 
 
 
 

German conductors (music)
Classical accompanists
Academic staff of the University of Music and Theatre Leipzig
1939 births
2000 deaths
People from Greifswald